Germantown is an unincorporated community in Adams Township, Decatur County, Indiana.

A large share of the early settlers being natives of Germany likely caused the name to be selected.

Geography

References

German-American culture in Indiana
Unincorporated communities in Decatur County, Indiana
Unincorporated communities in Indiana